Robert Gough  was an Irish Anglican priest.

Gough was educated at Balliol College, Oxford. He was Precentor of Limerick Cathedral in 1615;  and was Archdeacon of Ardfert from 1628 to 1641.

References

17th-century Irish Anglican priests
Archdeacons of Ardfert
Alumni of Balliol College, Oxford